The Army of Central Lithuania was the armed forces of the state of Central Lithuania proclaimed by General Lucjan Żeligowski on October 12, 1920.

With the announcement by General Lucjan Żeligowski of the establishment of Central Lithuania, the army which he commanded and which participated in the Żeligowski's Mutiny automatically became the Army of Central Lithuania. It was reincorporated into Polish Army in 1922 following the Poland's annexation of Central Lithuania.

The original composition of the troops

1st Lithuanian–Belarusian Division 

 1st Infantry Brigade
 Vilnius Rifles Regiment – later 85th Vilnius Rifles Regiment
 Minsk Rifles Regiment – later 86th Infantry Regiment
 2nd Infantry Brigade
 Navahrudak Rifles Regiment – later 80th Infantry Regiment
 Hrodna Rifles Regiment – later 81st Hrodna Rifles Regiment

 1st Lithuanian-Belarusian Field Artillery Regiment
 Mounted Riflemen Squadron
 1st Sapper Company
 mjr. Kościałkowski's "Bieniakonie" (Benekainys) Group
 Kresy Battalion
 216th Field Artillery Squadron
 Cavalry Squadron

Military operations 
After the seizure of Vilnius, the Supreme Commander of the Army of Central Lithuania, General Żeligowski, ordered the troops to advance to the line: Trakai-Kraso (in Polish) (?)-Rykantai and Bendoriai-Riešė-Paraudondvariai.

Until 29 November 1920, when the Kaunas Armistice was concluded, Central Lithuania was in the state of an undeclared war with the Republic of Lithuania.

1st Central Lithuanian Army Corps 
During the fighting, the Army of Central Lithuania was reorganized and on 16 October 1920, the 1st Central Lithuanian Army Corps was created. The corps commander was General Jan Rządkowski, the commander of the 1st Lithuanian-Belarusian Division.

 Command
 Commanding officer– gen. Jan Rządkowski
 Staff
 Chief of Staff – p.o. mjr SG Władysław Powierza
 Quartermaster– p.o. mjr SG Władysław Powierza
 Chief of the 4th Branch (Oddziału IV) – p.o. mjr SG Władysław Powierza

1st Division (Vilnius Infantry Brigade) 
 Vilnius Rifles Regiment
 Minsk Rifles Regiment

2nd Division (2nd Hrodna Infantry Brigade) 
 Navahrudak Rifles Regiment
 Hrodna Rifles Rgiment

3rd Division 
 Lida Rifles Regiment
 Kaunas Rifles Regiment

3rd Upper Nemunas Infantry Brigade 
 5th Volunteer Rifles Regiment
 6th Scouts Rifles Regiment (after the dissolution of the 3rd Brigade and 5th Volunteers Rifles Regiment, the 6th Scouts Rifles Regiment was independent)
 77th Infantry Regiment (two companies)

1st Artillery Brigade 
 1st Light Artillery Regiment
 two squadrons of the 216th Light Artillery Regiment

Cavalry Division of the Army of Central Lithuania

Reserve Brigade of the Army of Central Lithuania

Others 
 Sapper Battalion
 Armoured Car Platoon
 Services

Dislocation of branches of the Benekainys Operational Group 
Location on 27 October 1921:

Command of 19th Infantry Division - Vilnius 
 Vilnius Rifles Regiment – Vilnius
 Minsk Rifles Regiment – Vilnius
 Kaunas Rifles Regiment – Vilnius
 19th Field Artillery Regiment – Vilnius
 3rd Heavy Artillery Regiment – Vilnius

Command of the 29th Infantry Division - Vilnius 
 Grodno Rifles Regiment – Vilnius
 Lida Rifles Regiment – 
 1st Rifles Battalion  – 
 2nd Rifles Battalion  – Šalčininkai
 3rd Rifles Battalion  – 
 Navahrudak Rifles Regiment – Vilnius
 29th Field Artillery Regiment – Vilnius
 29th Heavy Artillery Squadron and III Squadron of the 3rd Heavy Artillery Regiment – Vilnius

Command of the 3rd Cavalry Brigade - Vilnius

Command of the 10th Uhlan Regiment –  Lentvaris 
 1st squadron – Rūdiškės
 2nd squadron – Lentvaris
 3rd squadron – Trakai
 4th squadron – Valkininkai
 Machine carbine squadron – Trakai
 Technical squadron – Švenčionys

Command of the 13th Uhlan Regiment –  Vilnius 
 1st and 3rd  squadron, Machine carbine squadron, Technical squadron  – Vilnius
 2nd squadron – Paberžė
 3rd squadron – Trakai
 4th squadron –

Command of the 23rd Uhlan Regiment –  Maišiagala 
 1st squadron –  
 2nd squadron – 
 3rd and 4th squadron – Paberžė,
 3rd squadron – Trakai
 Machine carbine squadron – 
 Technical squadron – Maišiagala

References 

Republic of Central Lithuania
Polish Land Forces
Military units and formations established in 1920
Military units and formations disestablished in 1922